WZEE (104.1 FM) is a radio station licensed to Madison, Wisconsin and serving South Central Wisconsin.  Known on-air as "Z104," the station is owned and operated by iHeartMedia (formerly Clear Channel Communications until 2014) and broadcasts a Top 40 (CHR) music format.

Station history

The station originally launched in 1948 as WKOW-FM, sharing ownership with WKOW-AM (the current WTSO).  New ownership in the early 1950s re-called the station to WMFM.  In the mid-1970s, the station converted from classical music to its current Top 40 format, adopting the WZEE call sign and "Z104" on-air brand as well.

In its early years, "Z104" ran an automated Top 40 (CHR) format XT40 from Drake-Chenault programming, but live-and-local content would be added to the station over the years.  Z104 was original home to the popular morning drive-time pairing of "Connie and Fish" during the 2000s; the pair would move to Clear Channel's Milwaukee classic rock sister station WQBW in 2008, with the show remaining on WZEE in a simulcast.  When WQBW became top 40 station WRNW in 2010, "Connie & Fish" became "Connie & Curtis" after "Fish" Calloway left Clear Channel to work for the competitor 931 Jamz (WJQM).  On September 4, 2012, "Connie & Curtis" (who had left for WLHT in West Michigan, ironically a competitor of WZEE sister WSNX) would be replaced on both WZEE and WRNW by the nationally syndicated Elvis Duran and the Morning Show.  "Z104" schedule features voicetracked or syndicated programming (including Elvis Duran and fellow Premiere Networks show On Air with Ryan Seacrest).

HD Radio
WZEE broadcasts a HD radio signal, with its HD2 subchannel originally carrying an urban contemporary/hip-hop format to complement the main "Z104" format; that format was replaced in Fall 2013 by a simulcast of "Classical Highlights," a classical music channel that is heard on iHeartMedia's IHeartRadio platform.  By December 2022, Classical Highlights would be replaced with "The Standard," iHeartRadio's channel devoted to music and artists of the adult standards and golden oldies genres.

WZEE briefly aired a simulcast of sister sports station WTSO on its HD3 subchannel in 2012.  The HD3 signal would be restarted by July 2021, carrying the contemporary worship music network Air1 and serving as the originating signal of low-power simulcast W277AE, which is owned by Air1 parent Educational Media Foundation.

References

External links
 
 
 

ZEE
Contemporary hit radio stations in the United States
IHeartMedia radio stations